The Yarkand Massacre was an episode of violence that began on 28 July 2014 in Yarkant County, Kashgar Region of the Xinjiang Uyghur Autonomous Region, China, and lasted for several days, as Chinese police quelled the local unrest. While Chinese state media reported a few dozen fatalities, independent estimates range from hundreds to thousands.

The incident

Chinese authorities reported on 2 August 2014 that 37 innocent people (including 35 Han and 2 Uyghurs) and 59 thugs or terrorists (96 fatalities total) were killed in the 28 July violence in Yarkant County, Xinjiang, which the state media labelled a "organized, premeditated, well-planned, and vicious... terrorist incident, organized by a gang with ties to an overseas movement (Turkistan Islamic Party) which attacked local police stations and government offices".

Independent media as well as the World Uyghur Congress based on interviews with several residents reported that the incident started with a protest march following an extrajudicial killing of a Uyghur family of five during house to house searches in Bashkent Township (Beshkent Town), triggered by reports of illegal prayer gatherings. The protests were reported as peaceful at first, but escalated due to Chinese authorities use of excessive force. Local residents said in an Agence France-Presse report that in the nearby Elishku Township (Elishqu Village) about 500 people, including some refugees from Bashkent Township, armed with knives, axes and other farming tools were marching through the streets on 28 July, when they were attacked by a group of military police armed with assault rifles. Mahmouti, a local resident, heard the police yell "back off" to the crowd, followed by continuous gunfire, and then intermittent gunfire for about an hour. Yusup, another local farmer, said that none of the people who had gone to the demonstration had returned, and he estimated that about 1,000 people were missing. Further fatalities occurred during house to house searches that followed over several days and were reported in four villages in the region (those villages included Erik, Hangdi, and Dongbag, or No. 14, 15 and 16 in the township), although the reports differ on whether most fatalities occurred on the first day or in subsequent days.

The Apple Daily reported that sources close to military intelligence said that the violence in Yarkant County, Xinjiang was a massacre in which between 3,000 and 5,000 people from four villages were slaughtered, with no survivors. Most independent sources report the death toll as hundreds or thousands.

Aftermath 
Investigation into the events has been made difficult due to the Chinese government's denial of it and censorship of independent and social media. Foreign journalists who attempted to investigate this incident were denied access, and later reported being unable to find unintimidated locals willing to talk to them. Internet and mobile access in the region was severely restricted for an unspecified length of time after the incident. Activists in China who provided information about it to international organizations have been arrested and sentenced for revealing "state secrets".

In 2016, the World Uyghur Congress called the incident was "the deadliest episode [in the region] since the unrest in Urumqi in July 2009".

In 2018, Apple Daily reported that several involved officials were detained on accusations of bribery.

References

See also
2014 China–Vietnam border shootout
2014 Kunming attack
April 2014 Ürümqi attack
Kizil massacre
May 2014 Ürümqi attack
Uyghur genocide
Xinjiang conflict
Xinjiang re-education camps

2014 in China
July 2014 events
Massacres in 2014
Massacres in China
Xinjiang conflict
Mass murder in 2014
2014 murders in China
2010s murders in China
Persecution of Uyghurs
21st-century human rights abuses
Human rights abuses in China
Anti-Islam sentiment in China
Religious persecution by communists